María Casado Paredes (born 14 March 1978) is a Spanish journalist and presenter. She is known for her longstanding involvement in the newscast department of Televisión Española (TVE) from 2005 to 2020.

Biography 
Born in Barcelona on 14 March 1978. After earning a licentiate degree in journalism from the University of Barcelona, she started working for the public radio broadcaster Radio Nacional de España (RNE) in 1999, as editor in Ràdio 4. After a brief spell in the Catalan public radio broadcaster Catalunya Ràdio as producer of El matí, she returned to RNE in 2003.

She entered TVE's newscast service in 2005. She became the anchor of the weekend edition of the Telediario in 2006 and co-hosted Informe Semanal from 2007 to 2009. She joined the political debate program  in 2009 (she had already hosted its Catalan-language equivalent 59 segons in the TV blocks of the Spanish public broadcaster in Catalonia). After the latter Globomedia-produced program was axed because of its costs in 2012, Casado briefly continued as host of its successor , as she soon became the presenter of the breakfast television news program Los Desayunos de TVE in that year, replacing Ana Pastor. She left Los Desayunos in 2016 to replace Mariló Montero as host of the morning television show La Mañana. She became the chairwoman of the Spain's  in 2018. In 2020, after 4 years hosting La Mañana, she was replaced by the meteorologist Mònica López as presenter of the show, which was renamed as La Hora de La 1. She subsequently left TVE and joined Antonio Banderas' Málaga-based production company Soho TV.

In 2020, Casado was the presenter on the Banderas-directed music web television series Escena en blanco y negro, released on Amazon Prime Video. On 6 March 2021, Casado and Banderas directed and hosted the 35th Goya Awards ceremony.

Her return to TVE was announced in October 2021, set the host a weekly show produced in Sant Cugat del Vallès.

References 

1978 births
Spanish women television presenters
Journalists from Catalonia
People from Barcelona
Living people
University of Barcelona alumni